Tuganjak (also Romanized as Tūganjak) is a village in Piveshk Rural District, Lirdaf District, Jask County, Hormozgan Province, Iran. At the 2006 census, its population was 120 (32 families).

References 

Populated places in Jask County